Carmichaelia corrugata (common name common dwarf broom) is a species of plant in the family Fabaceae. It is found only on the South Island of New Zealand.

Description 
Carmichaelia corrugata is a low growing (2-8 cm tall) leafless shrub consisting of yellow-green branches with blunt orange tips, forming a dense mat about 1 m wide. The branches are 1.5-3.5mm wide and grooved. The flowers are in pairs and are pink with a dark purple centre, and flowering occurs from October to May, with fruiting from November to June.

Habitat
It is found on gravel and sand soils, stone and gravel ridges, river terraces, river beds, and disturbed sites.

Taxonomy & naming
The species was first described by Colenso in 1883.  The specific epithet, corrugata, is a Latin adjective meaning "wrinkled". There are no synonyms.

Conservation status
In both 2004 and 2008, it was assessed as "Not Threatened". In 2012, it was found to be "At Risk - Declining", and by 2018 it was declared "Threatened - Nationally Vulnerable" under the New Zealand Threat Classification System.

References

Further reading
 pdf

External links
Carmichaelia corrugata occurrence data from Australasian Virtual Herbarium
NZPCN (for images & more detailed description)

corrugata
Flora of New Zealand
Taxa named by William Colenso
Plants described in 1883
Endangered flora of New Zealand